Calle Real (Royal Street in Spanish), officially named as J.M. Basa Street, is a historic street located in the old downtown district Iloilo City Proper of Iloilo City, Philippines.The street often referred to as the "Escolta of Iloilo". It is home to several fine examples of historic luxury American era neoclassical, beaux-arts, and art deco buildings. The street has been famous since the Spanish Era. However, its importance has dwindled and the street has become less maintained; yet there have been efforts to revitalize the street, which include the restoration of the historic buildings along the street and beautification projects.

The street's heritage designation by the local government, has been expanded into a zone known as Calle Real Heritage Zone which covers the long stretch of J.M. Basa and the streets and thoroughfares of Aldeguer, Mapa, Ortiz, Muelle Loney (Loney Wharf), Solis, Rizal, Iznart (from Chinese Arch to Iloilo Central Market).

History

Even during the Spanish era, this street was the main street of commerce for Iloilo. José Rizal was even impressed by the city during his arrival.

During the early period of American occupation of the Philippines, Calle Real was known as a hub of high-end shopping outlets selling products from Europe.

The street was officially renamed in honor of Jose Maria Basa, a Filipino businessman-propagandist who was a compatriot of José Rizal. The street remained popularly known as Calle Real. The name would also be later used to refer to the central business district of Iloilo City.

The Art-Deco buildings and other structures along the street deteriorated but remained to be a shopping hub of the city. Calle Real as a district consisting of Aldeguer, Guanco and Iznart, J. M. Basa, and Mapa streets was declared an Iloilo City heritage zone by the virtue of Ordinance No. 00-054, also known as the Local Cultural Heritage Conservation Ordinance which established the Iloilo City Cultural Heritage Conservation Council (ICCHC).

The National Historical Commission of the Philippines declared Calle Real as a district and a heritage zone on August 8, 2014, with the unveiling of a historical marker outside the Villanueva Building. Its current restoration has been a public-private partnership between the government and the Iloilo Cultural Heritage Foundation, Inc. (ICHFI).

Other efforts to revitalize the district include the pedestrianization of Calle Real, burying of utility wires, and minimizing obstructive advertisements. Regarding pedestrianization, experimentations have been done, including closing the road during Sundays, but permanent pedestrianization is still contested. Cultural performances are staged to promote Ilonggo heritage and to attract domestic and foreign tourists. The experimentation ended on March 9, 2014; the Philippine Chamber of Commerce Iloilo wished to make this permanent, citing this opportunity to make walking viable and to take pride in the newly rehabilitated heritage buildings of the street.

Buildings

Calle Real Proper

Calle Real is noted for its historic buildings, many of which were built between the late 19th century and the early 20th century.

 Edificio de E/R Villanueva – Dating back to 1927, the E/R Villanueva Building was once known as the International Hotel, which hosted American, British, Spanish patrons as well as Chinese bankers, merchants and bankers. It fell into disuse and deteriorated. It was in 2012 that the building was restored.
 Edificio de. S. Villanueva
 Edificio de Celso Ledesma
 Teatro Regente 
 Edificio/Cine Aguila
 Aduana de Iloilo – Iloilo Customs House, the largest customs house outside Manila. One of the only three heritage customs houses in the country after the ones in Manila and Cebu
 Edificio de Elizalde y Compañia (Cia) – A bahay na bato-styled edifice now housing the Philippine Museum of Economic History, the first museum dedicated to economic history in the Philippines
 Guadarrama
 Hoskyn's Department Store – first department store outside of Manila

See also 
 Calle Escolta
 Colon Street

References

Streets in the Philippines
Tourist attractions in Iloilo City